The Kingston-upon-Thames by-election of 4 May 1972 was held after Conservative Member of Parliament (MP) John Boyd-Carpenter was appointed chairman of the Civil Aviation Authority. The seat was retained by the Conservatives, with Norman Lamont winning. He held the seat for 25 years until it was abolished in 1997. (Lamont is best known for serving as Chancellor of the Exchequer 1990–1993, during the Premiership of John Major.)

Results

References

Kingston-upon-Thames by-election
Kingston-upon-Thames by-election
Kingston-upon-Thames by-election
Kingston-upon-Thames by-election
Kingston-upon-Thames,1972
Politics of the Royal Borough of Kingston upon Thames